FOB Shawqat was an International Security Assistance Force (ISAF) Forward Operating Base (FOB) operated by the British Armed Forces and located in Nad Ali District, Helmand Province, Afghanistan. The FOB was established on the site of a British Built mud brick fort dating from the Anglo-Afghan Wars.

The base was used under Operation Herrick (OP H).

History

It has been used by:
 OP H X - 19th Light Brigade (April 2009 - October 2009):
 1st Battalion, Welsh Guards
 Battlegroup HQ
 Prince of Wales's Company
 4th Battalion, The Rifles
 R Company
 OP H XI - 11 Light Brigade (October 2009 - April 2010):
 OP H XII - 4th Mechanized Brigade (April 2010 - October 2010):
 OP H XIII - 16 Air Assault Brigade (October 2010 - April 2011):
 1st Battalion, Royal Irish Regiment
B Company
 16 Medical Regiment, RAMC
 2 Royal Tank Regiment - Cyclops
 51 Parachute Squadron, Royal Engineers
 OP H XIV - 3 Commando Brigade: (April 2011 - October 2011)
45 Commando
Whiskey Company
 OP H XV - 20th Armoured Brigade (October 2011 - April 2012): 
 OP H XVI - 12th Mechanized Brigade: (April 2012 - October 2012)
1st Battalion, The Royal Anglian Regiment
 OP H XVII - 4th Mechanized Brigade (October 2012 - April 2013):
Royal Scots Borderers, 1st Battalion The Royal Regiment of Scotland
 Delta Company
 21 Royal Engineer Regiment, 4 Squadron
22 Engineer Regiment
 OP H XVIII - 1st Mechanized Brigade (April 2013 - October 2013):
2nd Battalion, The Duke of Lancaster's Regiment

The base was closed down during August 2013.

See also
List of ISAF installations in Afghanistan

References

Military bases of the United Kingdom in Afghanistan